Goldfield Mill or Grover's Mill is a Grade II listed tower mill at Tring, Hertfordshire, England which has been converted to residential accommodation.

History

Goldfield Mill was first mentioned in Pigot's Directory of 1839 when James Grover was the miller. The mill remained in the Grover family until 1880. In 1898, a  steam engine was installed as auxiliary power. During Thomas Liddington's tenure of the mill, miller Henry Liddington was fined £10 for taking an excessive toll of flour. Goldfield Mill was working by wind until 1908, when miller James Wright left to assume the tenancy of Pitstone Windmill. The mill worked by steam until the 1920s The mill was converted to residential accommodation in 1973.

Description

Goldfield Mill is a four-storey tower mill. It had a pepperpot cap winded by a fantail. There were four Double Patent sails. The upright shaft and cast iron great spur wheel survive.

Millers
James Grover 1839-61
William Grover 1861-80
Thomas Liddington 1880-85
White & Putnam 1885-95
James Wright 1895-1908

Reference for above:-

References

External links
Windmill World webpage on Goldfield Mill.

Towers completed in the 1830s
Tring
Windmills in Hertfordshire
Tower mills in the United Kingdom
Grinding mills in the United Kingdom
Grade II listed buildings in Hertfordshire
Grade II listed windmills